Mik may refer to:
 Mik, Iran, a village in Kurdistan Province
 Josef Mik, Czech entomologist
 Mik Aoki, college baseball coach, currently head coach of Morehead State, formerly of Notre Dame, Boston College, and Columbia 
 Mik, the pseudonym of Danish comics artist Henning Dahl Mikkelsen